is the Japanese franchise of the game show Deal or No Deal. It is hosted by Shinsuke Shimada and aired on the TBS network. So far, the show has been aired only twice: on September 8, 2006 as both a "birthday program" and a Friday-night Special (known in the channel as ) and on April 5, 2007. While the show is called as such, Shimada uses the familiar catchphrase "Deal or No Deal".

Overview
The show follows a modified version of the traditional Dutch format, and it is modeled after the US version: 26 briefcases each held by a model. The case values range from just one yen up to ten million yen (about US$86,000).

Since Japanese law at the time prohibited game shows from giving monetary prizes that are worth more than two million yen to a single person, each game is played by a contestant with three beneficiaries or a team of up to four people (with beneficiaries numbered according to the number in the team) who would share the prize they would win. As is common practice in Japanese game shows, all contestants have thus far been Japanese celebrities.

The case values in the first episode are as follows.

The case values in the second episode are as follows.

In the show, the case values are written in kanji, so for instance ¥8,000,000 would be written as 800 (happyaku man en).

Below are the certain modifications to the game:
The number of rounds have been reduced to just six to speed up the game. The first round involves opening seven cases, the second round involves six, the third round involves opening five, and the fourth round has four briefcases opened. In each of the last two rounds, one case is opened. Of course, at the end of each round, the banker makes his offer.
When the banker gives Shimada the offer, Shimada then writes the offer (again in 万円, man-en or "ten thousands-of-yen" format) on a whiteboard and shows it to the team. In many other versions, the host orally states the offer, which is then flashed on a screen nearby.
The contestant/team does not have to say "Deal" or "No Deal" or even do hand gestures. They just have to raise a sign that states their response to the offer ("Deal" or "No Deal").

In the first episode aired so far, the largest amount won was by the team of Tsutomu Sekine, Tomomi Nishimura, Yuko Ogura, and Masayuki Watanabe, who all took the banker's offer of ¥4,000,000 at the end of the fourth round; their suitcase contained twice that amount. Each of other teams in that episode played on to the end, but won four-digit prizes (two teams won ¥8,000, one got ¥3,000). In the second episode, the largest amount won was by the team of two duos, Kano sisters and FUJIWARA, who all took the banker's offer of ¥5,000,000 at the end of the last round; their suitcase also contained twice that amount, which was the top prize.

It is unknown at this time if the show will become a full-fledged series, although there have been two episodes so far. At this point in time, plans for the series have been shelved.

External links 
 
 

Deal or No Deal
Japanese game shows
2006 Japanese television series debuts
TBS Television (Japan) original programming